Anguiano is a small town in the province of La Rioja, Spain. It is located near Nájera and has a population of about 546 people (2006).

Anguiano is famous for its caparrones, red beans that are usually eaten in a stew with chorizo, and a yearly festival is held honoring these beans. The town is known as well for its traditional dance on stilts.

Places of interest
 Monastery of Nuestra Señora de Valvanera

See also
Caparrones

References

External links 

 Pictures of Anguiano

Municipalities in La Rioja (Spain)